Associação Atlética República, República da Aclimação or simply República is a football club based in Aclimação, São Paulo, Brazil. It disputed the APEA championships since 1919, participating in the first division of the Campeonato Paulista in 1927, and for the FPF in 1933 and 1934.

República also participated in the first match with night lighting that is recorded in history, against SE Linhas e Cabos (São Paulo Light Company employees' club), at Rua do Glicério, where 20 electric tram headlights were used to illuminate the playing field, on June 23, 1923. 

The club maintains its activities to these days, playing only as an amateur level.

Honours

Campeonato Paulista Third Level:
Winners (1): 1924 (APEA)

External links

References

Association football clubs established in 1914
1914 establishments in Brazil
Football clubs in São Paulo